San Yu Naing (born 31 December 1987) is a Burmese retired footballer who played as a midfielder. She has been a member of the Myanmar women's national team.

International career
San Yu Naing capped for Myanmar at senior level during the 2008 AFC Women's Asian Cup qualification, the 2010 AFC Women's Asian Cup, the 2012 AFC Women's Pre-Olympic Tournament.

References

External links

1987 births
Living people
Burmese women's footballers
Women's association football midfielders
Myanmar women's international footballers